Loku Kudla (born 27 January 1988) is an Indian poet and lyricist working in the Tulu film industry.

References

External links

1988 births
Living people
Indian lyricists
Indian male poets